The 1973 AIAW women's basketball tournament was held on March 22–25, 1973.  The host site was Queens College in Flushing, New York.  Sixteen teams participated, and Immaculata University was crowned national champion at the conclusion of the tournament, for the second straight year.

Immaculata finished the season undefeated (20–0), becoming the first undefeated national champion in women's college basketball.

Tournament bracket

Main bracket

Consolation bracket

References

AIAW women's basketball tournament
AIAW
AIAW National Division I Basketball Championship
1973 in sports in New York (state)
Women's sports in New York (state)